The Centre for Policy Dialogue (CPD), established in 1993 by Rehman Sobhan, its Founder chairman, with support from leading civil society institutions in Bangladesh, is mandated by its Deed of Trust to service the growing demand originating from the emerging civil society of Bangladesh for a more participatory and accountable development process. CPD seeks to address this felt-need from the perspectives of marginalised stakeholders, by way of organising multistakeholder consultations, by conducting research on issues of critical national, regional and global interests, through dissemination of knowledge and information on key developmental issues, and by influencing the concerned policy making processes.

CPD strives to bridge the gap between empirical research and policy advocacy through a sustained effort in public policy analyses. Over the past eighteen years CPD has emerged as Bangladesh's premier civil society think-tank, and has established its credibility as one of the very few platforms in Bangladesh where civil society organisations, stakeholder groups and political parties, often with diverse views and perspectives, are agreeable to sit around a dialogue table, and conduct an informed discussion about key issues of developmental concern and interest.

Over the years, CPD has evolved into a South Asia centre of excellence and has attained credibility as a distinguished focal point for issues relating to the least developed countries (LDCs).

The centre was recognised as one of the top 228 leading think-tanks by the first global Go to Think Tank Survey in 2007, and was selected for support under the Think Tank Initiative through a globally competitive process.

Focus 
CPD is an independent think-tank with local roots and global outreach. CPD focuses on frontier issues which are critical to the development process of Bangladesh, South Asia and LDCs in the present context, and those that are expected to shape and influence country's development prospects from the medium-term perspective. CPD's current programme portfolio includes research activities, holding of dialogues, publication and dissemination, and networking-related initiatives. CPD strives to enhance national capacity for economy-wide policy analyses, foster regional co-operation, and addresses issues which relate to Bangladesh's effective integration into the process of regionalisation and globalisation.

CPD activities also focus on challenges for regional co-operation and integration in South Asia. Moreover, CPD engages its capacity to analyse and highlight factors affecting socioeconomic progress in the LDCs. CPD has been organising Indo-Bangladesh dialogues on a regular basis where high level policymakers and representatives of key stakeholder groups of the two countries discuss issues of bilateral interest. CPD is also actively involved in the Kunming Initiative which strives to foster co-operation among Bangladesh, China, India and Myanmar. Among other things, CPD regularly organises international fora of the civil society organisations to advance the interests of the LDCs in the UN, WTO and other multilateral institutions.

Target Groups 

CPD's target groups are diverse and include both global and local policymakers. CPD seeks to provide voice to the interests and concerns of the low-income economies in global development discourse. In doing so, CPD involves all important cross-sections of the society including public representatives, government officials, business leaders, representatives of grassroots organisations, academics, development partners and other relevant interest groups. These different groups are engaged in exchange of views in all the three phases of the CPD process: identification of socially relevant issues, generation of inputs for policy analysis, and validation of policy recommendations.

Operational Modality 

CPD's civic activism in policy-related areas is operationalised through various means which are implemented by way of concrete initiatives. These include:

 Knowledge generation through research and analysis, creation and management of data and information base.
 Policy appreciation through dialogues, networking, information dissemination and mobilising support of the civil society for concrete policy agendas.
 Policy influencing at national, regional and international levels, by involving policymakers in the dialogue process, and by contributing to preparation of global policy documents and national policy briefs.
 Capacity building by way of organising policy appreciation workshops for policymakers and other important stakeholder groups.

Dialogue 

At the core of CPD's activities lies its dialogue programme. CPD designs the dialogue format in such a way as to stimulate constructive engagement and informed exchange of views. Since the CPD dialogues are not intended to be merely academic, but tailored towards implementation, the discussions are designed to come up with specific recommendations reflecting stakeholders' views in terms of redefining the policies and ensuring their effective realisation on the ground. These recommendations are then placed before current and prospective policymakers of the country as inputs to the policy making process. One of the major CPD initiatives of recent times was the Bangladesh Vision 2021, a document prepared under the initiative of the Nagorik Committee (Citizen's Committee), based on a wide-ranging consultation held in Dhaka and several district headquarters of the country.

Beyond issues of national importance, CPD dialogues also focus on those that concern regional and global interests of the country and other LDCs.

Research 

CPD maintains an extensive research portfolio focusing on frontier issues that would define Bangladesh's socioeconomic transformation in the immediate future. The research issues pursued by the centre also address the interests and concerns of South Asian as well as LDCs.

The evolving research programme of CPD reflects the expressed demands of the policymakers, and attempts to provide voice to the absentee stakeholders in the policy making process. CPD deploys multistakeholder dialogues, along with traditional research techniques, to elicit analytical insights and to seek validation of the research conclusions.

As a centre of excellence, CPD endeavours to interface its research outcomes with the ongoing global debates on contemporary development discourse. CPD partners with research institutions and agencies of global acclaim. For more than a decade now, CPD, as a partner institute of the World Economic Forum (WEF), is contributing to the Global Competitiveness Report (GCR). CPD is currently spearheading an independent partnership of international institutions to follow up the outcome of the Fourth UN LDC Conference.

CPD's flagship output, titled the Independent Review of Bangladesh's Development (IRBD) regularly monitors the policy environment, macroeconomic indicators and sectoral variables of the country. Challenging the Injustice of Poverty: Agendas for Inclusive Development in South Asia is one of the important studies carried out by the CPD in recent times.

Some of the other issues addressed in the immediate past at CPD included agricultural productivity and diversification, implications of WTO negotiations, regional connectivity and trade facilitation, implications of trade liberalisation on employment, promotion of foreign direct investment, impact of climate change on livelihood concerns, assessment of social safety net programmes, economic costs of spousal violence, export diversification, and efficacy of development institutions.

Ongoing recent research activities of CPD have clustered under the following eight broad themes:

 Macroeconomic Performance Analysis
 Poverty, Inequality and Social Justice
 Agriculture and Rural Development
 Trade, Regional Cooperation and Global Integration
 Investment Promotion, Infrastructure and Enterprise Development
 Climate Change and Environment
 Human Development and Social Protection
 Development Governance, Policies and Institutions

Contribution to Policy Making 

CPD researchers have been actively involved in contributing to the policy making process in the country as members of various committees and working groups set up by a range of public bodies including the Bangladesh Bank, Planning Commission, Ministry of Commerce, Ministry of Industries, and Ministry of Agriculture. CPD senior research staff are members of Panel of Economists for the Sixth Five-Year Plan, Boards of state-owned banks, WTO Advisory and Working Groups, and various other policy forums. Senior researchers of CPD, on a regular basis, disseminate CPD's research findings to the wider public through comments and interviews in newspapers, television and radio channels, and international media. They also regularly participate in television talk shows. Writing of op eds and popular pieces by the CPD researchers for leading newspapers on a regular basis is another way to reach the policy voice.

Support to Young Professionals 

With a view to promote development vision and policy awareness amongst the young people of the country, CPD is implementing a Youth Leadership Programme. The aim of the programme is to inculcate leadership qualities and promote civic responsibility amongst the young professionals of the country through internship, research involvement, dialogue participation and civic activism. CPD regularly hosts international interns.

Capacity Building 

CPD has been putting a considerable effort to support research-related capacity building in the country. The objective is to enable researchers, academics and representatives of various stakeholder groups to better appreciate and understand key issues related to Bangladesh's development, and give them exposure to analytical approaches and tools for in-depth examination of those issues. As part of such initiatives, CPD organises, on a regular basis, Advanced Lecture Series for fresh Economics graduates from universities where senior CPD staff deliver lectures on such topics as macroeconomic policy management, regional co-operation and impact of globalisation. Over the past eleven years CPD has been regularly organising Policy Appreciation Workshops on WTO and Bangladesh for mid-level government officials, researchers, academics, NGO representatives and journalists. CPD has also conducted courses on WTO and Implications for Bangladesh for young journalists and junior faculty of the Department of Economics of various universities.

Publication and Dissemination 

CPD pursues a comprehensive programme for disseminating its research and dialogue outputs through regular publications and web-postings. CPD's current publication list contains more than 370 titles including Books, Monographs, Working Papers (Occasional Papers), Dialogue Reports and Policy Briefs.

CPD Books and Monographs have been published by The University Press Ltd. (UPL), Pathak Shamabesh and on CPD's own initiative. CPD outputs are available for sale at the centre and also in selected bookstores in Bangladesh. The Working Papers (Occasional Papers) and Dialogue Reports are posted on CPD's website. Information about ongoing CPD activities is also regularly published in the CPD Quarterly.

Reference and Documentation Unit 

CPD has established a Reference and Documentation Unit (RDU) which serves as a repository of books, monographs, journals, periodicals and newspaper clippings on current and strategic policy issues. RDU puts special emphasis on policy documents and unpublished policy-related materials. Information generated through CPD's dialogue programmes and research activities is also systematically catalogued by the RDU.

Website and Media 

CPD has created a website to expand its outreach and expedite the dissemination of dialogue and research outputs. The website has enabled CPD to substantially enhance its networking capacity. The address of the website is http://www.cpd.org.bd

CPD has also launched its own blog for enhancing interaction with its stakeholders from different quarters. The blog was launched in March 2010. The blog allows posting of comments and sharing of views on CPD's latest activities, published reports and all other postings. It can be visited from the CPD Website Homepage.

CPD's public dialogues are usually extensively reported by the print media and covered by the electronic media in Bangladesh.

Networking with Partner Institutions 

CPD looks upon its capacity to fruitfully network with various organisations and institutions within the civil society as one of its core strengths. As of now, CPD has initiated and hosted a number of dialogues and research programmes in collaboration with organisations such as Oxfam International, ICTSD (Geneva), ODI (London), The Commonwealth Foundation, OECD,  United Nations Conference on Trade and Development (UNCTAD), UNDESA, UNDP, Economic and Social Commission for Asia and the Pacific (UNESCAP), World Trade Organization (WTO), ILO, FAO, IRRI, Asian Development Bank (ADB), and the World Bank.

CPD is a partner institute of the World Economic Forum, popularly known as the Davos Forum, since 2001; DeFiNe Network of OECD Development Centre, Paris; and the ARTNeT-UNESCAP. CPD also maintains membership with the South Asia Network of Economic Research Institutes (SANEI) and a number of other Networks, and is one of the four Founders of the South Asia Economic Summit, an initiative of the premier civil society think-tanks in South Asia.

Key personnel

Chairman: Rehman Sobhan
Executive Director: Fahmida Khatun
Distinguished Fellow: Debapriya Bhattacharya
Distinguished Fellow: Prof Mustafizur Rahman
Director (Dialogue & Communication): Anisatul Fatema Yousuf
Head, Research Division: Khondaker Golam Moazzem

Significance
According to the University of Pennsylvania's 2014 Global Go To Think Tank Index Report, CPD is number 46 out of 60 in the "Top Think Tanks in Southeast Asia and the Pacific".

See also
 List of institutes in Bangladesh

References

External links
 

Think tanks based in Bangladesh
Research institutes in Bangladesh
Organisations based in Dhaka
1993 establishments in Bangladesh
Bangladeshi research organisations
Bangladesh
Economic research institutes